The greater siren (Siren lacertina) is an eel-like amphibian and one of the three members of the genus Siren. The largest of the sirens and one of the largest amphibians in North America, the greater siren resides in the coastal plains of the southeastern United States.

Description 
S. lacertina is paedomorphic, as are all sirens. They lack hindlimbs as well as a pelvic girdle, and have external gills all throughout their lives along with small lungs. They lack eyelids, and have an unfused pectoral girdle. Coloration varies throughout their range, but they are generally an olive or gray color with small yellow or green dots on their sides. They have about 36 to 40 costal grooves between their armpits and their cloaca. Younger sirens also have a light stripe along their sides, which fades with age. The front legs, each with four toes, are so small that they can be hidden in the gills. 

In terms of sensory organs, greater sirens rely on both a modified Jacobson's organ and a lateral line system over their small eyes. It is possible that they are capable of sensing disturbances in electrical fields.

Behavior 
 Greater sirens are carnivorous and prey upon invertebrates (such as insects, crustaceans, gastropods, bivalves, spiders, molluscs, and crayfish) and aquatic vertebrates (such as small fish) with a possible preference for molluscs, although they have been observed to eat vegetation such as algae. They are nocturnal and spend the day in dense vegetation. Their lifespan in the wild is unknown, but in captivity they can live up to 25 years. Greater sirens can vocalize, producing clicks or yelps sounding similar to the call of the American green tree frog. They are predominately found in the deep benthic zone where aquatic insects are most abundant. They are able to aestivate for multiple years if necessary, burrowing into mud and exuding a cocoon of dead skin cells. Known predators include the American alligator and the mud snake. Other predators of this species are poorly documented. However, on June 19,2008 a greater siren was consumed by a Two-Toed Amphiuma (Amphiuma m.) indicating that this species could be an additional predator of the greater siren.

Their spermatozoa possess a pair of flagella, and their courtship behavior is unknown. Mating occurs in February and March, with mothers guarding clutches of eggs that hatch about two months later. Youth live in shallower water than adults, often among the roots of water hyacinths.

Distribution 
They inhabit the coastal plain from Washington, D.C., to Florida and Alabama. A population of sirens in the Rio Grande has been tentatively determined to be S. lacertina. Greater sirens live in wetlands, preferring those with a slow or nonexistent current and a thick layer of organic material. They are capable of inhabiting seasonal and permanent wetlands given their ability to aestivate, and will burrow into mud if their wetland dries up. Associated habitat for greater sirens includes vegetative ditches, and various other forms of slow, or stagnant bodies of water. Often during the day, they seek refuges from predators and are found under logs and various other structures.

Interaction with humans

Trapping techniques 
S. lacertina is difficult to capture because of their preference for areas with thick vegetation. Standard methods such as dip-netting, seining, and dredges are ineffective in such habitats. The use of aquatic funnel traps, commercially produced to capture crayfish, has been found effective for use on Siren and Amphiuma species and there is no risk of drowning the animals. Each trap consists of the trap body, three funnels, and a neck with a lid at the top.

Conservation 
Greater sirens are classified as Least concern by the International Union for Conservation of Nature, although they have been extirpated from some of their former range due to habitat loss. They are protected under Mexican law and are assigned to the "Special Protection" category.

References

External links

Giant Salamanders of Florida

Sirenoidea
Amphibians of the United States
Amphibians described in 1766
Taxa named by Carl Linnaeus